Hoddle Highway is an urban highway in Melbourne linking CityLink and the Eastern Freeway, itself a sub-section of Hoddle Main Road. Both these names are not widely known to most drivers, as the entire allocation is still best known as by the names of its constituent parts: Hoddle Street, Punt Road and Barkly Street. This article will deal with the entire length of the corridor for sake of completion, as well to avoid confusion between declarations.

The highway is named after the surveyor Robert Hoddle, who planned central Melbourne's Hoddle Grid.

Route
Hoddle Street starts at the intersection with Queens Parade and High Street in Fitzroy North and heads south, crossing the Eastern Freeway one kilometre later: it is from here the Hoddle Highway officially starts. It continues south until the intersection with Wellington Parade and Bridge Road, becoming Punt Road. It continues south, passing near the Melbourne Cricket Ground, under Citylink in Richmond, across the Yarra River via the Hoddle Bridge through the South Yarra district to where St Kilda Road and Dandenong Road meet at St Kilda Junction; here the highway declaration ends, but the road continues south on the other side of St Kilda Junction as Barkly Street through the St Kilda city centre, to eventually terminate at Marine Parade in Elwood.

The highway is frequently clogged with traffic, particularly during peak hour and during sport events, as it passes through Melbourne's inner suburbs and the city's main sporting and events precinct as a four-lane undivided road.

History
The elimination of the railway crossing at the Clifton Hill railway gates, where Heidelberg-Eltham Road (known today as Heidelberg Road) crossed the Hurstbridge and Whittlesea railway lines and then Hoddle Street, was approved by the Victorian government on 19 May 1955, instructing the Country Roads Board (later VicRoads) to proceed with the construction of a road overpass. The Board contracted the project to Lewis Construction Co. Pty. Ltd., estimated to cost A£240,000. Work commenced in February 1956, with the southern portion open to traffic in April 1957, and the remaining sections, including the ramps leading to and from Hoddle Street, opening several weeks later in May 1957.

The Country Roads Board declared Hoddle Main Road a Main Road in the 1959–60 financial year, from Queens Parade in Fitzroy North, along Hoddle Street through Richmond, along Punt Road through South Yarra, and along Barkly Street to Elwood.

Hoddle Main Road (including all its constituent roads) was signed as Metropolitan Route 29 between Fitzroy North and Elwood in 1965.

The passing of the Transport Act of 1983 (itself an evolution from the original Highways and Vehicles Act of 1924) provided for the declaration of State Highways, roads two-thirds financed by the State government through VicRoads. The Hoddle Highway was declared a State Highway in September 1994, from Victoria Street in Richmond to the St Kilda Junction in St Kilda, later extended north to the interchange with the Eastern Freeway in January 1995; all roads were known (and signposted) as their constituent parts.

The passing of the Road Management Act 2004 granted the responsibility of overall management and development of Victoria's major arterial roads to VicRoads: in 2004, VicRoads re-declared the road as Hoddle Highway (Arterial #6080), beginning at the interchange of Hoddle Street with the Eastern Freeway at Clifton Hill and ending at St Kilda Road (Nepean Highway) in St Kilda, while re-declaring the remnants between Clifton Hill and Elwood as Hoddle Main Road (Arterial #5880); as before, all roads are still known (and signposted) as their constituent parts.

1969 Melbourne Transportation Plan
The Hoddle Street – Punt Road – Barkly Street corridor was designated in the 1969 Melbourne Transportation Plan as the F2 Freeway. Part of the F2 Freeway would have connected St Kilda Junction to the Metropolitan Ring Road at the Hume Freeway (Craigieburn Bypass), via the Hoddle Highway and Merri Creek.

Hoddle Street Massacre
In 1987, Hoddle Street was the site of a deadly shooting spree known as the Hoddle Street massacre. The perpetrator, 19-year-old army recruit Julian Knight, killed seven people and injured 19 others during his rampage. He is currently serving seven consecutive terms of life imprisonment.

Major intersections

References

External links 

Highways and freeways in Melbourne
Streets in Melbourne
Transport in the City of Melbourne (LGA)
Transport in the City of Yarra
Transport in the City of Port Phillip
Transport in the City of Stonnington
St Kilda, Victoria
East Melbourne, Victoria